RabbiEzekiel Isaac Malekar is the head of the Jewish community in New Delhi, India. He is the Honorary Secretary of the Judah Hyam Synagogue at the corner of Humayun road, where he works voluntarily. The Synagogue, in addition to serving the Jewish community of New Delhi, caters to the Jewish diplomats from foreign missions. It has hosted former Israeli Prime Ministers like Shimon Peres and felicitated David Danieli, the present Israeli Ambassador to India. Indian Jews also come here for important rituals like Brit milah, Bar Mitzvah and Bat Mitzvah for girls. He is Bene Israel.

Mr. Malekar, in addition to being a scholar of Judaism, is a noted human rights activist and a Deputy Registrar (Law) with the National Human Rights Commission in India. He was a key participant in the 15th International Conference on Human Integration (inaugurated by Rajinder Singh Ji Maharaj, a Sikh religious cleric and President of the World Council of Religions), at Kirpal Bagh, New Delhi on February 6, 2006.

He is actively involved in inter-faith activities between the Jewish community and the Hindu majority in India, as well as the Sikh community. He has praised the multicultural nature of Indian Society where Judaism had existed for 2,000 years without ever experiencing anti-Semitism. Malekar has also presided over inter-faith marriages. He has asserted that his innate Indianness was infinitely more important than his consciousness of being a Jew.

He quotes:
“According to Rabbi [sic] Hillel, the Torah can be capsulated into only one commandment: ‘What is hurtful and hateful to you, do not do to another.’ Everything else is footnote.”

He has also written on women in Judaism, saying that the New Delhi Jewish community has not had any issues with the polemics of gender. Under his influence, the Judah Hyam Synagogue has emerged as a center for religious reform in the field of women's participation.

He is a recipient of the Mahavir mahatma Award for preserving Jewish heritage and culture in India, and the Ambassador of Peace Award instituted by the Federation for Religious harmony and Brotherhood. He has contributed several articles in leading newspapers in India.

References

External links
 Jewish Heritage in India, The Indian national Trust for Art and Cultural Heritage
 Global Perspective Inter-faith dialogue
 He, She or it?, A godly debate rages, Times of India
 Delhi's People, Starlight and Shadows, The Indian Express
 Prince Charles as "Defender of Faiths A dialogue in India on how religion can contribute to a harmonious society

Indian Jews
Indian rabbis
Marathi people
21st-century rabbis
Year of birth missing (living people)
Living people
Bene Israel